The von Plötzke, or von Plötzkau (earlier spelling Ploceke, Plocike) family is an old-line noble family from Saxony and Masovia.

History 
Conrad de Ploceke for example, married the daughter of a lienholder of the Holy Roman Empire Duke Boleslaw III of Poland and his wife Salome von Berg Schelklingen. 

Płock in Masovia, an independent duchy straddling Polish and Saxon territories until the death of the last duke of Masovia in 1526, came under the full rule of the Kingdom of Poland. The title of Duke of Masovia was retained but as a fief of Poland. The von Plötzke family were the hereditary Dukes of Masovia. 

In the mid 13th century, after considerable disagreement with the reigning Piast dynasty in Poland, members of the family joined the knights of the Teutonic Order. Most notable was Heinrich von Plötzke, while born a Duke of Masovia, did not use the title and became a major officer (including Komtur) of the Knights.

Due to Plock and Masovia's location next to Poland and inter-marriage with Polish noble families, the family name is listed among both Polish and German noble families.

Notable members
 Thietmar of Plötzkau (also Dietmar, d. 23 September 1148), as Thietmar II Bishop of Verden (1116–1148) 
 Heinrich von Plötzke (also Henry of Płock, d. 1320), Land Master of Teutonic Prussia (1307–1309), Prussian Grand Commander (1309-1312) and then till 1320 Marshall of the Order of the Teutonic Knights.

Plotzke
Plotzke

References